Dowse is a surname. Notable people with the surname include:

 Charles Dowse (1862–1934), Irish Anglican bishop
 Denise Dowse (born 1958), American actress and director
 Edward Dowse (MP) (1582–1648), English politician
 Edward Dowse (1756–1828), American politician
 George Willoughby Dowse (1869–1951), known as "George Willoughby", English comic actor and theatre manager in Australia
 John Dowse (rugby union, born 1891) (1891–1964), Irish rugby union player, later a British Army general
 John Dowse (priest) (died 1892), Dean of Ferns, Ireland
 John Henry Dowse (born 1935), Australian rugby union player
 Michael Dowse (born 1973), Canadian film director
 Percy Dowse (1898–1970), New Zealand politician
 Richard Dowse (1824–1890), Irish politician
 Sydney Dowse (1918–2008), Royal Air Force pilot
 Thomas Dowse (c.1630–1683), English-American politician
 Tom Dowse (1866–1946), American baseball player
 William Dowse (1770–1813), American lawyer